Arrakis Therapeutics is a Waltham, Massachusetts-based biopharmaceutical company developing drugs for neurological disorders and other diseases. The company was co-founded in 2015 by Jennifer Petter, PhD, now Chief Innovation Officer (a former drug R&D leader at Celgene, Avila, Mersana, Biogen, and Sandoz/Novartis) Raj Parakh, Alan Walts and Henri Termeer. Arrakis has been led since October 2016 by CEO Michael Gilman, PhD, a former Biogen executive who co-founded and led Padlock Therapeutics (bought out by Bristol-Myers Squibb in 2016) and Stromedix (acquired by Biogen Idec in 2012).

Named after the desert world in Frank Herbert’s science fiction classic Dune, Arrakis’ founding in 2015 made it one of the first companies to create a platform for purposeful discovery of RNA-targeting small molecule drugs. While there are already approved drugs based on RNA-targeting small molecules, they have been found by accident whereas Arrakis intends to take a systematic approach, Gilman says. The company claims a bioinformatic tool will allow its scientists to identify sites on RNA that can bind small molecules, while another set of chemical biology tools will allow researchers to validate the molecules’ efficacy and selectivity. In addition to neurology, Arrakis will also target cancer and rare genetic diseases.

In February 2017, Arrakis received a $38.5 million Series A round from investors including pharmaceutical giants Celgene and Pfizer.

References

Biotechnology companies of the United States